Kim Min Jeong (The romanization preferred by the author according to LTI Korea) (born 1976) is a South Korean poet and literary editor.

Life 
Kim Min Jeong was born in Incheon, South Korea in 1976. She studied creative writing at Chung-Ang University and also completed master's level coursework there. She began writing for a magazine in her third year of university and later joined Random House Korea as an editor. She edited the Random House series of poetry collections, which served as a springboard for South Korean Futurist poets and made a large impact on the country's poetry scene in the 2000s. As editor of the series, she discovered a number of young poets like Kim Kyung Ju and Hwang Byungsng. She became editor-in-chief at Random House Korea.

She made her literary debut in 1999 when Geomeun nanaui kkum (검은 나나의 꿈 Nana's Black Dream) and nine of her other poems won the Munye Joongang Literary Award for Best First Poem. In the 2000s, she became a well-known poet and a leading literary editor. She currently serves as the President of Nanda Books, an imprint of Munhakdongne, and edits Munhakdongne poetry series and novels.

Kim won the 8th Park In-Hwan Literary Award and 17th Weolgan Contemporary Poetry Award. She has produced and edited many unconventional works and bestsellers including poetry collections, literary essays, travelogues by writers, and special features. She also teaches university courses.

Writing 
Kim's poems criticize the pretentious and male-dominated nature of the South Korean poetry scene. They bluntly expose social injustices using fierce poetic diction and imagination, and have served as a source of inspiration for later poets. Rejecting the dichotomy of "good versus evil" and "truth versus lies," Kim's works capture raw images of our times with intensity and wit. She ridicules the notion that poetry should be serious or mysterious, and has striven to make South Korean poetry more accessible. Themes of her poetry include the hope for a society without violence and hypocrisy.

Works

Poetry collections 

1.  『날으는 고슴도치 아가씨』(열림원, 2005) { Flying Miss Hedgehog. Yolimwon, 2005. }

2.  『그녀가 처음, 느끼기 시작했다』(문학과지성사, 2009) { For the First Time, She Felt It. Moonji, 2009. }

3.  『아름답고 쓸모없기를』(문학동네, 2016) { Let It Be Beautiful and Useless. Munhakdongne, 2016. }

Essay collections 

1.  『각설하고,』(한겨레출판사, 2013) { So Anyway,. Hanibook, 2013. }

Works in translation 
1. Poems of Kim Yideum, Kim Haengsook & Kim Min Jeong (English)

2. Beautiful and Useless (English)

Awards 
1. 2007: 8th Park In-Hwan Literary Award

2. 2016: 17th Weolgan Contemporary Poetry Award

References

Further reading 
1. 오형엽, ｢환상과 향유-황병승, 김민정, 이민하의 시｣, 『환상과 실재』, 문학과지성사, 2012(978-89-320-2351-9) { Oh, Hyeong-yeop. "Illusion and Pleasure: The Poetry of Hwang Byungsng, Kim Min Jeong, and Lee Min-ha." In Fantasy and Reality. Moonji, 2012. }

2. 조재룡, ｢시를 찾아나선 경쾌한 상황극-김민정론｣, 『시는 주사위 놀이를 하지 않는다』,  문학동네, 2014(978-89-546-2415-2) { Jo, Jae-ryong. "An Amusing Skit in Search of Poetry: On Kim Min Jeong." In Poetry Does Not Play a Game of Dice. Munhakdongne, 2014. }

3. 이원, ｢시집 김민정｣, 『아름답고 쓸모없기를』, 문학동네, 2016(978-89-546-4003-9) { Lee, Won. "Poetry Collection of Kim Min Jeong." In Let It Be Beautiful and Useless. Munhakdongne, 2016. }

External links 
1. Book Review: Chaos and Courage: Poems of Kim Yideum, Kim Haengsook & Kim Min Jeong

2. 작가와 문학사이](14)김민정－허를 찌르는 솔직함 { "Between a Writer and Literature: Kim Min Jeong and Her Disarming Frankness." The Kyunghyang Shinmun. Last modified April 13, 2007. }

3. 시인 김민정 "시, 현실의 족쇄를 끊고 날아보게 해 { "Poet Kim Min Jeong: 'Poetry Unshackles Me from Reality and Lets Me Fly.'" The Kyunghyang Shinmun. Last modified July 18, 2016. }

1976 births
Living people
Chung-Ang University alumni
Literary editors
South Korean women poets